Class 103 can refer to:

Class 103 - British diesel multiple unit
DB Class 103 - German electric locomotive